The Border Wireless is a lost 1918 American silent Western film produced and directed by William S. Hart and distributed by Artcraft Pictures, an affiliate of Famous Players-Lasky and Paramount Pictures. Hart stars in the film along with Wanda Hawley as his leading lady.

Cast
 William S. Hart as Steve Ransom
 Wanda Hawley as Elsa Miller
 Charles Arling as Herman Brandt
 Erich von Ritzau as Frederick Schloss
 Bert Sprotte as Von Helm
 Marcia Manon as Esther Meier
 James Mason as Carl Miller (unbilled)

References

External links

 
 

1918 films
1918 Western (genre) films
1918 lost films
American black-and-white films
Films directed by William S. Hart
Lost American films
Lost Western (genre) films
Silent American Western (genre) films
1910s American films
1910s English-language films